California's 31st State Senate district is one of 40 California State Senate districts. It is currently represented by Democrat Richard Roth of Riverside.

District profile 
The district encompasses urbanized and suburban parts of the Inland Empire in northwestern Riverside County. It forms an arc stretching from Corona in the west to Perris in the southeast, centered on the city of Riverside.

Riverside County – 43.0%
 Corona
 Coronita
 Eastvale
 El Cerrito
 Highgrove
 Home Gardens
 Jurupa Valley
 Mead Valley – partial
 Moreno Valley
 Norco
 Perris
 Riverside

Other levels of government

Election results from statewide races

List of senators 
Due to redistricting, the 31st district has been moved around different parts of the state. The current iteration resulted from the 2011 redistricting by the California Citizens Redistricting Commission.

Election results 1992 - present

2020

2016

2012

2008

2004

2000

1996

1992

See also 
 California State Senate
 California State Senate districts
 Districts in California

References

External links 
 District map from the California Citizens Redistricting Commission

31
State Senate 31
Government in Riverside, California
Corona, California
Jurupa Valley, California
Moreno Valley, California
Norco, California
Perris, California
Inland Empire